The Gauss Tower is a reinforced concrete observation tower on the summit of the Hoher Hagen in Dransfeld, Germany. The tower can be reached directly by car.  A restaurant with a panoramic view is located inside the tower.

The tower is named for Carl Friedrich Gauss, who made the large triangle from the Hohen Hagen break into Inselsberg a basis of his survey of Hanover.

From 1909 to 1963, there had already been a Gaussturm nearby. It broke when a quarry was expanded too far in the 1950s.

Data
Construction period: 11 months 
Completion: September 1964 
Viewing platform: 528 m over NN 
Tower height: 51 m 
Foundation: 6 m deep, with a diameter of 13 m. 
Diameter of tower shaft: 5 m 
1st platform: 18 m (at a value of 14,5 m) 
Top platform: 13 m 
Elevator capacity: Maximum 8 persons 
Travel time: 55 seconds 
Emergency stairway: 225 steps, leading from the viewing platform to the entrance and/or the cellar

See also
 List of towers

External links
 
 

Observation towers in Lower Saxony